Andrew Paul Harriss (11 August 1954 – 1 October 2022) was an Australian politician. He was a Liberal Party member of the Tasmanian House of Assembly from March 2014 to February 2016, representing the electorate of Franklin.

Harriss was an independent member of the Tasmanian Legislative Council from 1996 to 2014, amassing a lengthy conservative voting record. He resigned from the Legislative Council in 2014, a short time before the conclusion of his Legislative Council term, in order to contest the House of Assembly election as a Liberal. He had previously lost a race as a Liberal candidate at the 1996 Tasmanian election. After the Liberals won the 2014 election, he was appointed Minister for Resources. In that role, he generated criticism for his combative stance against environmentalists.

On 17 February 2016, Harriss announced that he was resigning from the Hodgman ministry and from the parliament, effective the next day. Kingborough Council councillor Nic Street was elected in a countback to fill the vacancy on 1 March 2016.

He died on 1 October 2022.

References

External links
Paul Harriss' maiden speech to parliament

1954 births
2022 deaths
Members of the Tasmanian Legislative Council
Members of the Tasmanian House of Assembly
Liberal Party of Australia members of the Parliament of Tasmania
Independent members of the Parliament of Tasmania
21st-century Australian politicians
Deaths from prostate cancer